The Pythian Games were one of the four Panhellenic Games of Ancient Greece. They were held in honour of Apollo at his sanctuary at Delphi every four years, two years after the Olympic Games, and between each Nemean and Isthmian Games. The Pythian Games were founded sometime in the 6th century BC. In legend they were started by Apollo after he killed Python and set up the oracle at Delphi. They continued until the 4th century AD.

The Pythian Games were ranked second in importance behind the Olympics. Unlike the Olympics, the Pythian Games also featured competitions for art and dance, which pre-dated the athletic portion of the games, and women were allowed to take part in some events. Victors received a wreath of bay laurel, sacred to Apollo, from the city of Tempe, in Thessaly. Smaller versions of the Pythian Games were celebrated in many other cities of the Levant and Greece.

Mythology 
The Pythian Games supposedly start with the death of the mythical serpent, Python. Ovid states that the games were inaugurated to celebrate Apollo's killing of the serpent, "Lest in a dark oblivion time should hide
the fame of this achievement, sacred sports
he instituted" (Metamorphoses, 1.445-6). According to Ovid, the python was produced spontaneously by Gaea (mother earth) at the beginning of primordial time and was a threat to human beings.

When Earth, spread over with diluvian ooze,
felt heat ethereal from the glowing sun,
unnumbered species to the light she gave,
and gave to being many an ancient form,
or monster new created. Unwilling she
created this enormous Python.—Thou
unheard of serpent spread so far athwart
the side of a vast mountain, didst fill with fear
the race of newly created man. The God
that bears the bow (a weapon used till then
only to hunt the deer and agile goat)
destroyed the monster with myriad darts,
and almost emptied all his quiver, till
envenomed gore oozed forth from livid wounds.

-- Metamorphoses, 1.434-444.

By killing the monster, Apollo rendered the area safe for human beings and established his ownship of the site. 
After burying the body, Apollo founded the oracle of Delphi. However, by slaying Python, Apollo had committed a crime and Zeus declared that he had to make amends.  Apollo then created the Pythian Games to pay for the death.

History

The historical timeframe of the Pythian Games started in 582 BC, when the administration of the Games was handed over to the Delphic Amphictyony, a council of twelve Greek tribes, at the end of the First Sacred War. As of that time, they did not take place every eight years as in the past, but every four years, two years before and after the Olympic Games, presumably at the end of August.

Preparations for the games began six months prior. Nine citizens from Delphi, called theoroi, were sent to all Greek cities to announce the beginning of the games in order to attract athletes, as well as to declare the period of the Sacred Truce (Hieromenia), aiming at protecting not only the theoroi and the athletes who traveled to Delphi but also the temple of Apollo itself. If a city was involved in armed conflict or in robberies during that period, its citizens were forbidden to enter the Sanctuary, participate in the games, or consult the Oracle. At the same time, the truce allowed the Amphictyony to focus on preparing for the games, which included restorations for all structures of the Sanctuary, from the temples to the streets and fountains. Scores of people flocked to the games from all over Greece, bringing in substantial revenue to the city. 

Despite the rise of Christianity in the Roman Empire during the 4th century, Delphi remained an active pagan site and the Pythian Games continued to be celebrated at least until AD 424.

Overview 
Unfortunately, the testimonials and documents covering the Pythian Games were mainly destroyed by human violence and natural catastrophes. All the remaining resources highlight the glory and glamour of the Games. The records of Aristotle present an overview of the festivities: the Games lasted for six to eight days and were started by a reenactment of the victory of Apollo over Python. In a festive and glamorous procession, a ritual sacrifice was performed in the Temple of Apollo. After four days of festivities, the Games began.

Events
The athletic and equestrian events were the same as those at Olympia, apart from the lack of the four-horse chariot, and the addition of running races for boys.

Unlike at Olympia where there was a separate festival for women (the Heraean Games), women were allowed to compete at Delphi in both athletic and artistic events. The only recorded female victor is Tryphosa, winner of the girl's stadion running race.

The athletic competition included four-track sports (stade, diaulos, dolichos and hoplitodromos (racing encumbered with pieces of Hoplite armor)), wrestling, boxing, pankration, and the pentathlon. These sports were introduced to the games gradually over time. The final day of the games was dedicated to equestrian races which gradually came to include harness racing, synoris (a chariot drawn by two horses), a chariot drawn by four horses, and racing with a horse (without a chariot), held in a hippodrome in the plain of Krisa, not far from the sea, in the place where the original stadium was sited. (ref: Pindar) The other athletic contests took place in the Stadium.

In the Roman period theatrical competitions were introduced, carried out in the late-Hellenistic theater.

Music
Pausanias writing in the 2nd century AD, says the oldest contest at Delphi was the singing of the Hymn to Apollo, god of arts and music. The first Games run by the Delphic Amphictyony, which he dates to the third year of the forty-eighth Olympiad (i.e. 586  BC) featured contests of singing accompanied by cithara (a lyre), and separate contests for playing the aulos (a double-reeded wind instrument) solo, and accompanied. The latter of these was abolished by the second Games because the music was considered "ill-omened" with dismal tunes accompanied by lamentations. Pythocritus of Sicyon was aulos victor at six consecutive festivals, the only player so to distinguish himself. He accompanied the pentathlon at the Olympics where a statue was erected to him.

Pausanias ascribes the introduction of the cithara contest without vocals to the eighth Pythian Games.

Poetry, prose and drama
Poetry and prose contests were another feature of the Pythian Games. A panel of judges chose victors. Contests of Tragic acting probably involved both individual performances and dramatic productions.

Painting
Painting competitions were introduced in the mid-5th century BC.

Prizes
No monetary prizes were awarded to winners in the Games. Instead they received a wreath of bay laurel, sacred to Apollo, from the city of Tempe, in Thessaly. This is similar to the practice in the other Panhellenic games, which were all on this account called "stephanitic" ("crown") games. Smaller versions of the Pythian Games were celebrated in many other cities of the Levant and Greece.

Pindar and the Pythionikoi
Of the 45 poems composed by the Theban poet Pindar in honor of winners at the Panhellenic games, 12 were called Pythionikoi, since they were composed for winners at the Pythian Games. In those poems, Pindar praises not only the victors, but also their families, as well as the aristocratic and athletic ideals of the late archaic period.

The Pythionikoi as a source of information
Pindar worked on lyric poetry. The largest part of his surviving works is the Victory Odes (Epinikia), chorus songs to be sung in the homeland of the winner of the Games upon his return.

The Greek aristocracy of the first half of the 5th century BC, mostly the tyrants of Sicily and the conservative aristocracy of Aegina, constituted the clientele of the poet. Thus, his Odes  of Victory reflect the aristocratic ideals which were losing ground so fast. 
The winner's laudation is reinforced by adding mythological details. However, a prerequisite for understanding and cherishing the poems is a well-educated audience. The poet uses his work not only to speak of the victory won by his client and his family, but also to accentuate the family's history and its connections all over Greece.

The total number of Victory Odes  is 45 celebrating the winners in the four most famous panhellenic athletic competitions: the Olympic, the Nemean, the Pythian and the Isthmian Games. The hymns celebrating victories in Pythian Games include 12 odes and offer information on the exact competition of each athlete.
Thus, we can constitute a list of the winners as follows:

In 498 B.C. Hippokles from Thessaly won at the children's diaulos (10th Pythionicus).

In 490 B.C. Midas from Akragas won at the musical contests as a flute player (12th Pythionicus).

In 486 B.C. Megakles from Athens won at the chariot racing (7th Pythionicus).

In 475 (?) and in 474(?) B.C. Hieron of Syracuse won the chariot racing (2nd Pythionicus).

In 474 Thrasydaeus from Thebes won at the children's stadium (11th Pythionicus) and Telesikrates from Cyrene won at the armed race (9th Pythionicus).

In 470 B.C. Hieron from Aetna won at the chariot racing (1st Pythinicus).

Finally, in 462/1 B.C. Arkesilaus from Cyrene won at the chariot racing (4th and 5th Pythionikoi).

References

External links 

 Pythian Games
 International Pythian Council
 Modern Pythian Games
 Ecumenical Delphic Union
 https://www.afternoonnews.in/pythian-council-gets-coimbatore-based-state-conveners/

https://edtimes.in/india-paves-the-way-to-modern-pythian-games/
https://www.uniindia.com/pressrelease/india-paves-the-way-to-modern-pythian-games
https://www.apnlive.com/india-paves-the-way-to-modern-pythian-games/
https://www.zee5.com/articles/india-paves-the-way-to-modern-pythian-games
https://assianews.com/india-paves-the-way-to-modern-pythian-games/12183/
https://theoneindia.in/index.php/2022/04/06/india-paves-the-way-to-modern-pythian-games/
https://maghreb-observateur.com/?p=14365
https://www.polismagazino.gr/bijender-goel-founder-modern-pythian-games/
https://maghreb-observateur.com/?cat=99
https://delphiforum.gr/bijender-goel
https://www.youtube.com/watch?v=jY4kRyZapsg
http://pythiangames.org/

6th-century BC establishments in Greece
5th-century disestablishments in Greece
Ancient Delphi
Games Pythian
Panhellenic Games
Recurring sporting events established before 1750